This list contains links to lists with the common and scientific names of butterflies of North America north of Mexico.
 Papilionidae: swallowtails and parnassians (40 species)
 Parnassiinae: parnassians (3 species)
 Papilioninae: swallowtails (37 species)
Hesperiidae: skippers (300 species)
Pyrrhopyginae: firetips (1 species)
Pyrginae: spread-wing skippers (138 species)
Heteropterinae: skipperlings (7 species)
Hesperiinae: grass skippers (141 species)
Megathyminae: giant-skippers (13 species)
 Pieridae: whites and sulphurs (70 species)
 Pierinae: whites (29 species)
 Coliadinae: sulphurs (40 species)
 Dismorphiinae: mimic-whites (1 species)
 Lycaenidae: gossamer-wings (144 species)
 Miletinae: harvesters (1 species)
 Lycaeninae: coppers (16 species)
 Theclinae: hairstreaks (90 species)
 Polyommatinae: blues (37 species)
 Riodinidae: metalmarks (28 species)
 Nymphalidae: brush-footed butterflies (233 species)
Libytheinae: snouts (1 species)
Heliconiinae: heliconians and fritillaries (40 species)
Nymphalinae: true brushfoots (76 species)
Limenitidinae: admirals, sisters and others (37 species)
Charaxinae: leafwings (8 species)
Apaturinae: emperors (5 species)
Morphinae: morphos (3 species)
Satyrinae: satyrs (49 species)
Danainae: milkweed butterflies and clearwings (8 species)

See also
:Category:Butterflies of North America

External links
 
"Butterflies of North America" (1868-1872) by W. H. Edwards from the American Entymological Society; second series (1884), third series (1897)

 
 
North America
Butterflies
Butterflies